Militaru is a Romanian surname. Notable people with the surname include:

Alina Militaru (born 1982), Romanian long jumper
Constantin Militaru (born 1963), Romanian high jumper
Damian Militaru (born 1967), Romanian footballer and manager
Gigi Militaru (born 1986), Romanian rugby union player
Nicolae Militaru (1925–1996), Romanian general

See also
Georgeta Militaru-Maşca (born 1954), Romanian rower

Romanian-language surnames